Matthew David Hundley (born May 11, 2000) is an American soccer player who plays as a forward. Before turning pro, he appeared in the Premier Development League for Colorado Rapids U-23.

Youth 
Hundley played youth soccer for the Colorado Rapids Academy at the U-18/19 level before attending UCLA. Hundley played one year for the Bruins in 2018, appearing in all 19 matches, starting 14. Hundley finished with five goals and seven assists before being selected to the All-Pac-12 Second Team.

Professional 
Hundley became the ninth Rapids Academy product to sign a Homegrown contract with Colorado on Jan. 15, 2019. Hundley was loaned to Colorado Springs Switchbacks FC in the USL Championship on March 6. Hundley made 29 USL appearances for Switchbacks FC, 19 of them starts. Hundley scored his first professional goal in a 2-0 win over LA Galaxy II on Oct. 5.

On Feb. 21, 2020, Hundley was loaned to Memphis 901 FC in the USL Championship. Hundley made two starts in 10 appearances for Memphis and scored two goals as a substitute in a 3-2 win over North Carolina FC on Sept. 10. Hundley was on the Rapids' bench for MLS matches against Sporting Kansas City on Oct. 24 and Minnesota United FC on Oct. 28. 

In March 2021, Hundley returned to Colorado Springs on loan for the 2021 season.

On March 1, 2022, Hundley was waived by Colorado Rapids without having made a first team appearance.

References

External links
 UCLA profile
 
 

Living people
2000 births
American soccer players
Soccer players from Colorado
Sportspeople from Littleton, Colorado
Association football forwards
UCLA Bruins men's soccer players
Colorado Rapids U-23 players
Colorado Rapids players
Colorado Springs Switchbacks FC players
Homegrown Players (MLS)
Memphis 901 FC players
USL League Two players
USL Championship players
United States men's youth international soccer players
21st-century American people